is a train station in Tenri, Nara, Japan. Although the station is on the Sakurai Line as rail infrastructure, it has been served by the Man-yō Mahoroba Line since 2010 in terms of passenger train services. Tenri Station is also served by the Tenri Line of the Kintetsu Railway.

Lines
  JR-West
  Man-yō Mahoroba Line
  Kintetsu Railway
  Tenri Line

Layout
The station has two levels. The first level is used for the Tenri Line while the second level is used for the Man-yō Mahoroba Line.

JR West platforms
The station operated by JR West has 4 tracks with 2 island platforms.

Kintetsu Railway platforms
The station operated by Kintetsu Railway has 3 tracks with 2 island platforms and 2 side platforms (3 bay platforms). Since it is the terminal, there is no specification to which track is used for which service and destination.

Connections
Within a couple of minutes' walking distance from the main entrance, three bus stands serves local bus routes by Nara Kotsu Bus Lines and Tenri City Community Bus, as well as the inter-city and airport bus routes by Nara Kotsu Bus Lines and its co-operators, Kanto Bus, Keisei Bus, and Osaka Airport Transport.

History
 1898—The Nara Railway opened station as Tanbaichi Station.
 1905—The station becomes the part of the Kansai Railway.
 1907—It was owned by Japanese Government Railways (the predecessor of JNR).
 1915—The Tenri Light Railway expanded its route to Tenri.
 1921—The Tenri Light Railway was acquired by the Osaka Electric Railway (the predecessor of Kintetsu).
 1941—The Osaka Electric Railway and Sangu Kyuko Railway were merged.
 1944—Kankyu Tenri station was renamed as Kintetsu Tenri Station.
 1963—JNR Tanbaichi Station was renamed as Tenrishi Station.
 1965—As the Sakurai Line was elevated, both stations were merged into a single station.
 1987—JR-West succeeded JNR's passenger rail business.
 2007—PiTaPa, the contactless smart card, has been available at Kintetsu Tenri Station.

External links
 Official website (JR-West) 
 

Railway stations in Nara Prefecture
Railway stations in Japan opened in 1898